Junior Sipato Pokomela (born 10 December 1996) is a South African professional rugby union player for the  in the United Rugby Championship and Western Province in the Currie Cup. His regular position is loose forward.

Rugby career

2012–14: Under-16 and Under-18 rugby

Pokomela earned his first provincial selection in 2012, when he represented Eastern Province at the Under-16 Grant Khomo Week held in Johannesburg, starting all three of their matches in the tournament.

In 2014, Pokomela was selected to represent Eastern Province at the premier schools tournament in South Africa, the Under-18 Craven Week, held in Middelburg, once again starting all three of their matches in the tournament. At the conclusion of the tournament, Pokomela was included in a South Africa Schools squad. He was an unused replacement in their 40–15 victory over Wales, but started their next match as they suffered a 22–30 defeat to England.

2015: Eastern Province Under-19

In 2015, Pokomela joined the Eastern Province academy; he was included in the  squad that participated in Group A of the 2015 Under-19 Provincial Championship. He immediately established himself as the first choice Eighth man for the team, starting all fourteen of their matches during the competition. Pokomela scored his fourth try in three matches against Free State in a 31–15 semi-final victory to see his team reach the final.

2016: Super Rugby, Varsity Cup and Currie Cup qualification

On 13 December 2015, Pokomela was included on a list of 20 players released by the South African Rugby Union that would be part of the  squad for the 2016 Super Rugby season.

In March 2016, Pokomela was included in a South Africa Under-20 training squad, and made the cut to be named in a reduced provisional squad a week later. On 10 May 2016, he was included in the final squad for the 2016 World Rugby Under 20 Championship tournament to be held in Manchester, England, also being named vice-captain of the team. He started in their opening match in Pool C of the tournament as South Africa came from behind to beat Japan 59–19. He also started their other two pool matches as South Africa were beaten 13–19 by Argentina in their second match, but bounced back to secure a 40-31 bonus-point victory over France in their final pool match to secure a semi-final place as the best runner-up in the competition. He retained his starting spot in the play-offs, as South Africa faced three-time champions England in the semi-finals, but the hosts proved too strong for South Africa, knocking them out of the competition with a 39–17 victory. Following captain Jeremy Ward being handed a two-week ban for a dangerous tackle against England, Pokomela captained the side against Argentina in the third-place play-off final. Argentina beat South Africa – as they did in the pool stages – convincingly winning 49–19 and in the process condemning South Africa to fourth place in the competition.

References

South African rugby union players
Living people
1996 births
Rugby union players from Port Elizabeth
Rugby union flankers
Rugby union number eights
Eastern Province Elephants players
South Africa Under-20 international rugby union players
Cheetahs (rugby union) players
Free State Cheetahs players
Stormers players
Western Province (rugby union) players